Svenska Serien 1916–17, part of the 1916–17 Swedish football season, was the seventh Svenska Serien season played. IFK Göteborg won the league ahead of runners-up Örgryte IS.

League table

References 

Print

Online

1916-17
Sweden
1